William Newell (born October 5, 1988) is an American rower. He competed in the Men's lightweight coxless four event at the 2012 Summer Olympics.

References

External links
 

1988 births
Living people
American male rowers
Olympic rowers of the United States
Rowers at the 2012 Summer Olympics
Rowers from Boston
Harvard Crimson rowers